Blue Mountain Pass is a high mountain pass in Oregon, United States that is traversed by U.S. Highway 95.  It gets its name from Blue Mountain (elevation 7435), which is just west of the pass.  Blue Mountain and Blue Mountain Pass are located in south eastern Oregon, approximately 25 miles north of the Nevada border.  They are not a part of the similarly named Blue Mountains of north eastern Oregon.

References 

Mountain passes of Oregon
Landforms of Malheur County, Oregon